Arirang (Hangul: 아리랑) is a 1926 Korean silent film directed by Na Woon-gyu who also one of the main cast. It is regarded as one of the most influential films in Korean cinema history, as well as the first Korean nationalist film and a critique of the Japanese rule of Korea. It is named after the traditional song "Arirang," which audiences were said to sing at the conclusion of the film. Arirang is considered a lost film, but a written record of the plot still exists.

Plot
Yeong-jin is a student who has become mentally ill after being imprisoned and tortured by the Japanese for his involvement in the 1 March 1919 protest against the Japanese occupation of Korea. After his release, he returns home to live with his father and sister, Yeong-hui, in their village home. His old friend Hyeon-gu is now in love with Yeong-hui. While the villagers are preoccupied with a harvest festival, O Gi-ho, a collaborator with the Japanese police, attempts to rape Yeong-hui. Hyeon-gu fights Gi-ho, while Yeong-jin watches and has a vision of a couple in a desert begging a man for water. When the man in his imagination embraces the woman rather than offering her water, Yeong-jin stabs him with a sickle, actually killing Gi-ho. Yeong-jin regains his senses at this moment. The film ends with the Japanese police taking Yeong-jin back to prison, while the villagers weep.

Cast
 Na Woon-gyu(羅雲奎) as Yeong-jin(金永鎭)
 Shin Il-seon(申一仙) as Yeong-hui
 Nam Gung-un(南宮雲) as Hyeon-gu
 Ju In-gyu as O Gi-ho

Impact

Initial reception 
Arirang premiered at the Dansungsa cinema(then run by park seung pil) in Seoul on 1 October 1926, and quickly became a national sensation and a commercial success, screening at cinemas throughout the country. The film was a departure from the standard melodramas popular at the time because of its metaphorical resistance to Japanese colonial rule. It is considered to be Korea's first nationalist film.

Legacy 
Arirang is considered to be the first masterpiece of Korean cinema and an inspiration to many Korean filmmakers of the era. Today, the location where Arirang was filmed in Donam-dong, Seoul, is known as Arirang Movie Street. The street is home to Na Woon-gyu Park, the Arirang Cine Center movie theater, and the Arirang Information Library.

Gyeongi arirang, a variety of the song arirang is thought to be originated from the song Na Woon-gyu made for the film.

Sequels and remakes 
Na Woon-gyu made two sequels to Arirang: a silent film called A Story of the Day after Arirang (1930) and a sound film called Arirang 3 (1936).

Several directors have remade Arirang, including Lee Gang-chon in 1954, Kim So-dong in 1957, Yu Hyun-mok in 1968, and Lee Doo-yong in 2003. Lee Doo-yong's version was the first South Korean film to be publicly screened in North Korea.

Lost status
Along with almost all Korean films of this era, Na Woon-gyu's Arirang is considered to be a lost film. The original nine reels of the film are believed to have been lost during the Korean War. However, a copy of the film was rumored to be in the possession of Japanese collector, Yoshishige Abe, who died in February 2005. His collection of approximately 50,000 films reverted to the Japanese government after his death, but no news has yet come forth as to whether Arirang was found in the collection.

See also
 Korea under Japanese rule
 Cinema of Korea
 List of Korean-language films
 List of lost films

References

External links
 Arirang on the Korean Movie Database (in Korean)
 

1926 films
Pre-1948 Korean films
Lost Korean films
Korean silent films
Korean black-and-white films
Films directed by Na Woon-gyu
1926 lost films